Yavneh Day School may refer to:

Yavneh Day School (Los Gatos, California), United States
Yavneh Day School (Cincinnati, Ohio), United States